The Kashmir Valley, also known as the Vale of Kashmir, is an intermontane valley concentrated in the Kashmir Division of Jammu and Kashmir, India. The valley is surrounded by ranges of the Himalayas, bounded on the southwest by the Pir Panjal Range and on the northeast by the greater Himalayan range.

Geography
It is bounded by sub-ranges of the Western Himalayas: the Great Himalayas bound it in the northeast and separate it from the Tibetan plateau, whereas the Pir Panjal Range in the Lesser Himalayas bounds it on the west and the south, and separates it from the Punjab Plain. The Jhelum River is the main river of the Valley. It originates at Verinag; its most important tributaries are the Lidder and Sind rivers. Unlike other areas of Kashmir region, the Kashmir valley is densely populated owing to the availability of a large expanse of fertile flat land.

Climate
The Kashmir Valley has a moderate climate, which is largely defined by its geographic location, with the towering Karakoram Range in the north, Pir Panjal Range in the south and west, and Zanskar Range in the east. It can be generally described as cool in the spring and autumn, mild in the summer and cold in the winter. As a large valley with significant differences in geo-location among various districts, the weather is often cooler in the hilly areas compared to the flat lower parts.

Summer is usually mild and fairly dry, but relative humidity is generally high and the nights are cool. Precipitation occurs throughout the year and no month is particularly dry. The hottest month is July (mean minimum temperature 16 °C, mean maximum temperature 32 °C) and the coldest are December–January (mean minimum temperature −15 °C, mean maximum temperature 0 °C).

The Kashmir Valley enjoys a moderate climate but weather conditions are unpredictable. The record high temperature is 37.8°C and the record low is −18 °C. On 5 and 6 January 2012, after years of relatively little snow, a wave of heavy snow and low temperatures (winter storm) shocked the valley covering it in a thick layer of snow and ice.

The Valley has seen an increase in relative humidity and annual precipitation in the last few years. This is most likely because of the commercial afforestation projects which also include expanding parks and green cover.

Notes

See also
Kashmir Division

References

External links
 Kashmir Division Administration
 Kashmir Divisional Commissioner
 
 Vale of Kashmir

Valleys of Jammu and Kashmir
River valleys of India
Jammu and Kashmir